José Guadalupe A. Díaz Rivera (born March 16, 1954) is a Mexican football manager and former player. He was born in León, Guanajuato.

References

1954 births
Living people
Mexican footballers
Association football defenders
Club León footballers
C.F. Oaxtepec footballers
Club Puebla players
Mexican football managers
Footballers from Guanajuato
Sportspeople from León, Guanajuato